Blood of the Werewolf is a platform game developed and published by American indie studio Scientifically Proven for Microsoft Windows in 2013. An updated version was released for the PlayStation 3 and Xbox 360 in 2014.

Gameplay

Plot

In this ode to classic platformers, become Selena, a loving mother, devoted wife and—powerful werewolf. Take revenge on the monsters that have slain your husband and stolen your child.  Seamlessly transform from human to werewolf in light of the moon, as you shoot, slash and smash your way through over 30 enemies and face off against five brutal boss arenas.

Reception
Blood of the Werewolf received mostly mediocre review scores for the PC version but its reception was generally favorable in the case of the later Xbox 360 version. Cameron Woolsey of GameSpot gave it positive reviews and the scores of 7/10 for the PC original and 8/10 for the improved XBLA release, calling it "a wildly entertaining 2D action platformer, as beautiful as it was punishing." According to Joshua Vanderwall of The Escapist, "With a dash of Ghouls 'n Ghosts, a sprinkle of Mega Man, a pinch of Metroid, and a garnish of your favorite schlock horror tropes, Blood of the Werewolf is a brilliantly constructed homage to classic platforming."

References

External links

2013 video games
Horror video games
Indie video games
Majesco Entertainment games
Metroidvania games
PlayStation 3 games
PlayStation Network games
Side-scrolling platform games
Single-player video games
Video games developed in the United States
Video games featuring female protagonists
Video games using procedural generation
Werewolf video games
Windows games
Xbox 360 games
Xbox Live Arcade games
Ziggurat Interactive games